Catasetinae is a subtribe within the Orchidaceae and contains 8 genera. Its members are widespread in lowland tropical Central and South America up to 1,500 meters. They are found on trees, stumps or old fence posts.

Catasetinae are exclusively pollinated by male euglossine bees, which are attracted to the floral fragrances, and collect them. A particular Catasetinae species may attract only one or a few species of bees from the dozens that occur in the habitat.

Genera
 Catasetum (80–120 species)
 Clowesia (7 species)
 Cyanaeorchis (3 species)
 Cycnoches (some 30 species)
 Dressleria (10 species)
 Galeandra (18 species)
 Grobya (5 species)
 Mormodes (some 70 species)

The related genus Cyrtopodium is separated as subtribe Cyrtopodiinae.

Footnotes

References
  (1983): Orchid floral fragrances and male euglossine bees: methods and advances in the last sesquidecade. Biol. Bull. 164: 355–395.

 
Orchid subtribes